Breathing underwater or underwater breathing may refer to:

 Aquatic respiration
 Underwater breathing apparatus
 Liquid breathing

Creative works
 Breathing Under Water (film), by Susan Murphy Dermody (1993)
 Breathing Underwater, a 2001 novel by Alex Flinn
 Breathing Under Water, a 2007 album by Anoushka Shankar and Karsh Kale
 Breathing Underwater (album), a 2009 album by Marié Digby
 "Breathing Underwater", a 2012 song by Metric from Synthetica
 "Breathing Underwater", a 2016 song by Hollywood Principle featured in the Music of Rocket League and the 2017 album Starting Over. 
 "Breathing Underwater" (song), by Emeli Sandé (2016)